Philip Jordon (September 12, 1933 – June 7, 1965) was an American professional basketball player. He played seven seasons in the National Basketball Association (NBA).

Professional career

A 6'10" center from Whitworth University, Jordon played seven seasons (1956–1963) in the National Basketball Association as a member of the New York Knicks, Detroit Pistons, Cincinnati Royals, and St. Louis Hawks. He averaged 10.9 points per game and 6.9 rebounds per game in his career.

Jordon was a member of the Knicks' team that surrendered 100 points to the Philadelphia Warriors' Wilt Chamberlain on March 2, 1962, but he missed the game due to what was officially reported as influenza. Although it is speculated that Jordon was also suffering from a hangover, this claim has been disputed by Knicks teammate Willie Naulls. His absence is often cited as a reason for Chamberlain's high point total since it left the Knicks with only one player, Darrall Imhoff, large enough to guard Chamberlain.

Personal life
Jordon drowned after a rafting accident in Washington state on June 7, 1965. His raft, which was carrying four men, broke apart, and his body was discovered floating in Puget Sound on June 27.

Jordon was of Wailaki and the Nomlaki Native American descent.  His son, Jon Jordon, played for Central Washington University.

References

1933 births
1965 deaths
Accidental deaths in Washington (state)
Amateur Athletic Union men's basketball players
American men's basketball players
Basketball players from California
Centers (basketball)
Cincinnati Royals players
Deaths by drowning in the United States
Detroit Pistons players
Minneapolis Lakers draft picks
Native American basketball players
Native American sportspeople
New York Knicks players
People from Lakeport, California
St. Louis Hawks players
Whitworth Pirates men's basketball players